Ténès District is a district of Chlef Province, Algeria.

Communes 
The district is further divided into 3 communes:

 Ténès 
 Sidi Akkacha 
 Sidi Abderrahmane.

References

Districts of Chlef Province